The first season of Ilha Record premiered on Monday, July 26, 2021 at  on RecordTV.

The show features a group of celebrities, known as Explorers, living together on a desert island and competing against each other in extreme challenges to avoid  being exiled and continue their quest for lost treasures and the grand prize of R$500.000. Prior to the live finale, a public vote is held to determine who would become the season's Favorite Explorer and win the special prize of R$250.000. The inaugural season of Ilha Record was filmed in Paraty, Rio de Janeiro from June 1 to July 6, 2021.

Any Borges won competition after defeating Pyong Lee at the Island's final treasure hunt and took home the grand prize of R$500.000. Mirella Santos won the public's special prize of R$250.000 with 79.33% of the final vote against Nadja Pessoa. In addition, Pyong Lee received R$100.000 as runner-up, while Claudinho Matos and Nanah Damasceno earned R$10.000 each for being part of Any's crew in the final.

Cast

Explorers
The celebrities were officially revealed by RecordTV on May 27, 2021.

Future Appearances
After this season, in 2022, Dinei appeared with his wife Erika Dias in Power Couple Brasil 6, they finished in 12th place in the competition.

In 2022, Thomaz Costa appeared in A Fazenda 14, he finished in 17th place in the competition.

The game

Maps progress

Voting history

Notes

Exiles' power

Crew status

Public' favorite's results

Ratings and reception

Brazilian ratings
All numbers are in points and provided by Kantar Ibope Media.

References

External links
 Ilha Record 1 on R7.com

2021 Brazilian television seasons
Ilha Record
Television productions postponed due to the COVID-19 pandemic